The East Cornwall Premier League (ECPL)  is a football competition based in Cornwall and west Devon, England, in the United Kingdom. The league sits at level 12 of the English football league system and consists of 18 clubs. Due to a sponsorship arrangement, the league is currently known as the RRL East Cornwall Premier League.

Up to 20 clubs competed in a single division until the 2005–06 season, after which the league was split into two divisions for the first time, with the top 14 clubs from 2005–06 forming the Premier Division and the remaining clubs and a number of Plymouth-based sides transferring from the Plymouth and West Devon League to form a new Division One. Three teams from the East Cornwall League (Camelford, Dobwalls and Foxhole Stars) were promoted as founder members of the new South West Peninsula League Division One West in 2007. Premier Division champions St. Dennis were promoted at the end of the 2010–11 season, runners-up Sticker were promoted at the end of the 2011–12 season and Millbrook were promoted at the end of the 2013–14 season after finishing third.

For the 2019–20 season, the league reverted to one division after the creation of the St Piran League.

Member clubs for 2022–23 season
Foxhole Stars
Liskeard Athletic Reserves
Looe Town
Nanpean Rovers
Newquay Academy
North Petherwin
Roche
St Blazey Reserves
St Columb
St Dennis Reserves
St Minver
St Newlyn East
St Stephen
St Teath
Torpoint Athletic 3rds
Wadebridge Town Reserves

Recent champions
1990–91 – St Blazey Reserves
1991–92 – St Dennis
1992–93 – Liskeard Athletic Reserves
1993–94 – Liskeard Athletic Reserves
1994–95 – Nanpean Rovers
1995–96 – Saltash United Reserves
1996–97 – Nanpean Rovers
1997–98 – Callington Town
1998–99 – Callington Town
1999–2000 – St Dennis
2000–01 – Liskeard Athletic Reserves
2001–02 – Liskeard Athletic Reserves
2002–03 – Foxhole Stars
2003–04 – Liskeard Athletic Reserves
2004–05 – Foxhole Stars
2005–06 – Saltash United Reserves
2006–07 – Foxhole Stars (Premier), Tamarside (Division One)
2007–08 – Torpoint Athletic Reserves (Premier), St Stephen (Division One)
2008–09 – Torpoint Athletic Reserves (Premier), Plymouth Parkway Reserves (Division One)
2009–10 – Torpoint Athletic Reserves (Premier), St. Dennis (Division One)
2010–11 – St. Dennis (Premier), St. Dominick (Division One)
2011–12 – Torpoint Athletic Reserves (Premier), Liskeard Athletic Reserves (Division One)
2012–13 – Plymouth Parkway Reserves (Premier), Polperro (Division One)
2013–14 – Plymouth Parkway Reserves (Premier), Edgcumbe (Division One)
2014–15 – Torpoint Athletic Reserves (Premier), St Stephens Borough (Division One)
2015–16 – Torpoint Athletic Reserves (Premier), St Austell Reserves (Division One)
2016–17 – Torpoint Athletic Reserves (Premier), Plymouth Parkway Reserves (Division One)
2017–18 – Torpoint Athletic Reserves (Premier), Wadebridge Town Reserves (Division One)
2018–19 – St Austell Reserves (Premier), St Stephen (Division One)
2019–20 – season abandoned
2020–21 – season abandoned
2021–22 - Torpoint Athletic 3rds (Premier)

References

External links

Football mitoo site
FA Full Time site
South West Football Archive

 
2